Dino Pita (born September 20, 1988) is a Swedish undrafted basketball player that plays for Södertälje BBK. Pita is a  shooting guard.

Honours
Basketligan (2): 2013, 2016

References

External links
RealGM.com profile
FIBA.com profile

1988 births
Living people
Brussels Basketball players
Södertälje Kings players
Swedish men's basketball players
Swedish people of Bosnia and Herzegovina descent
Shooting guards